Popestar is the second EP by the Swedish rock band Ghost. It consists mainly of covers and was produced by Tom Dalgety. The EP was released on 16 September 2016, by Loma Vista Recordings. The band began the Popestar Tour of North America following its release.

Background
Popestar consists almost entirely of covers. Ghost chose unexpected songs that differed from their own musical style.

The only original track on the EP, "Square Hammer", was conceived at the end of the sessions for the band's Meliora album. Because the concept of the album was already in place and the song had a different feeling, the band decided not to include it on the album. "Square Hammer" was released as a single on 12 September 2016, prior to the EP.

Reception

Popestar debuted at No. 1 on Billboards Top Rock Albums chart, becoming the first EP to reach the chart's top position. It sold 21,000 copies in its first week.

Track listing

Personnel

Ghost
 Papa Emeritus III
 A Group of Nameless Ghouls

Additional personnel
 Sofia Kempe – backing vocals on "Missionary Man" and "Bible"
 Brian Reed – harmonica on "Missionary Man"

Technical
 Tom Dalgety – production, engineering, mixing
 Niels Nielsen – additional engineering, programming
 Markus Crona – assistant
 Joe LaPorta – mastering
 Necropolitus Cracoviensis Zbigniew Bielak II – cover artwork

Charts

References

2016 EPs
Ghost (Swedish band) EPs
Albums produced by Tom Dalgety
Loma Vista Recordings albums